Richard Krajicek and Jan Siemerink were the defending champions but lost in the first round to Kenneth Carlsen and Frederik Fetterlein.

Paul Kilderry and Pavel Vízner won in the final 7–5, 6–3 against Anders Järryd and Daniel Nestor.

Seeds
Champion seeds are indicated in bold text while text in italics indicates the round in which those seeds were eliminated.

 Byron Black /  Grant Connell (first round)
 Hendrik Jan Davids /  Cyril Suk (first round)
 Jakob Hlasek /  David Prinosil (first round)
 Paul Haarhuis /  Sjeng Schalken (semifinals)

Draw

References
 1996 Continental Championships Doubles Draw

Men's Doubles
Doubles